Wayne Alexander (born 17 July 1973) is a British former professional boxer who competed from 1995 to 2006. He challenged once for the WBO light middleweight title in 2001. At regional level, he held the British light middleweight title from 2000 to 2001 and the EBU European light middleweight title in 2002.

Amateur Highlights 
Alexander won the 1994 Amateur Boxing Association British light-middleweight title, when boxing out of the Lynn ABC. Thes ABA final was shown on BBC1 Sports Night with the late Harry Carpenter commentating.

1990 London ABA Class B 67 kg champion.
National Junior ABA Class B 67 kg champion.
1994 London ABA Light middleweight championship.
3 time SE London ABA Light middleweight champion in 1993, 1994 & 1995.
Represented England in the 1994 & 1995 Liverpool Multi-Nations.
Represented England against Denmark in 1994.
Represented England against Scotland in 1995.

Professional Highlights 
 2006-03-04 defended the World Boxing Union Light Middleweight Title beating Thomas McDonagh
 2004-09-10 won the World Boxing Union Light Middleweight Title beating Mehrdud Takaloo
 2002-01-19 won the vacant EBU (European) Light Middleweight Title beating Paolo Pizzamiglio
 2001-11-17 defended the BBBofC British Light Middleweight Title beating Joe Townsley
 2001-02-10 fought for WBO World Light Middleweight Title against Harry Simon but lost by TKO in the fifth round.
 2000-02-19 won the vacant BBBofC British Light Middleweight Title beating Paul Samuels
 1999-01-23 won the vacant BBBofC Southern Area Light Middleweight Title beating Ojay Abrahams

His professional fights have been showcased on Sky TV and he has also made an appearance on Box Nation. In November 2013, he joined the board of WBU Europe.

References

External links 
 

1973 births
Light-middleweight boxers
English male boxers
Living people

pt:Wayne Alexander
ru:Александер, Уэйн